Immigration to the Philippines is the process by which people migrate to the Philippines to reside in the country. Many, but not all, become citizens of the Philippines.

History

Prehistorical migration

Modern theories of the peopling of the Philippines islands are interpreted against the wider backdrop of the migrations of the Austronesian peoples. They comprise two major schools of thought, the "Out of Sundaland" models and the "Out of Taiwan" model. Of the two, however, the most widely accepted hypothesis is the Out-of-Taiwan model, which largely corresponds to linguistic, genetic, archaeological, and cultural evidence. It has since been strengthened by genetic and archaeological studies that broadly agree with the timeline of the Austronesian expansion.

Migration during the Spanish period
By the 16th century, Spanish colonization brought new groups of people to the Philippines mainly Spaniards and Mexicans. Many settled in the Philippines, and intermarried with the indigenous population. This gave rise to the Filipino mestizo or individuals of mixed Austronesian and Hispanic descent. There was migration of a military nature from Latin-America (Mexico and Peru) to the Philippines, composed of varying races (Amerindian, Mestizo and Criollo) as described by Stephanie J. Mawson in her book "Convicts or Conquistadores? Spanish Soldiers in the Seventeenth-Century Pacific". Also, in her dissertation paper called, ‘Between Loyalty and Disobedience: The Limits of Spanish Domination in the Seventeenth Century Pacific’, she recorded an accumulated number of 15,600 soldier-settlers sent to the Philippines from Latin-America during the 1600s. In which timeframe, the total population of the Philippines was only about 667,612. Old Spanish censuses state that as much as 33.5% or one third of the population of the main island of Luzon had full or partial Hispanic or Latino (Mestizo, Mulatto and Native-American) descent.

The current modern-day Chinese Filipinos are mostly the descendants of immigrants from Southern Fujian in China from the 20th century and late 19th century, possibly numbering around 2 million, although there are an estimated 27 percent of Filipinos who have partial Chinese ancestry, stemming from precolonial and colonial Chinese (Sangley) migrants from the past centuries especially during the Spanish Colonial Era. Intermarriage between the groups is evident in the major cities and urban areas, and spans back to Spanish colonial times, where a colonial middle-class group known as the Mestizo de Sangley (Chinese mestizos) descend from. Its descendants during the late 19th century produced a major part of the ilustrado intelligentsia of the late Spanish Colonial Philippines, that were very influential with the creation of Filipino nationalism and the sparking of the Philippine Revolution.

There are also Japanese people, which include escaped Christians (Kirishitan) who fled the persecutions of Shogun Tokugawa Ieyasu which the Spanish empire in the Philippines had offered asylum from to form part of the Japanese settlement in the Philippines. In the 16th and 17th centuries, thousands of Japanese people traders also migrated to the Philippines and assimilated into the local population.

Migration during the American period
The Philippines was a former American colony and during the American colonial era, there were over 800,000 Americans who were born in the Philippines. , there were 220,000 to 600,000 American citizens living in the country. There are also 250,000 Amerasians scattered across the cities of Angeles City, Manila, and Olongapo.

Population

The total number of immigrants and expats in Philippines as of the 2010 censuses is 177,365.

According to a 2013 country migration report, the recent most notable nationalities of foreign aliens with work permits include Koreans, Chinese, Japanese, Americans, and British (either British citizen or British National (Overseas) – from British Hong Kong). Most of these foreign aliens with work permits are based in the National Capital Region (Metro Manila), followed by Calabarzon (Southern Tagalog), and Central Visayas, representing the more developed regions of the country. Most of them are employed in the manufacturing sector, although they tend to be involved in other sectors as well. The majority work in administrative, executive and managerial positions. The top three nationalities of registered aliens are Chinese (59,000), Koreans (39,000) and Americans (26,000).

Immigrants and expats by country, according to the 2010 Census of Population and Housing:

United States	29,972
China	28,705
Japan	11,584
India	9,007
South Korea	5,822
North Korea	4,846
Canada	4,700
United Kingdom 3,474
Australia	3,360
Germany	3,184
Indonesia	2,781
Taiwan 	1,538
Italy	1,460
Afghanistan	1,019
France	1,014
Spain	1,009
Switzerland	872
Turkey	739
Singapore	691
South Africa	681
Malaysia	673
Saudi Arabia	621
Norway	550
Israel	514
Sweden	513
Iran	498
Tunisia	479
Belgium	445
Republic of the Congo	444
Austria	424
Pakistan	421
Netherlands	407
Algeria	389
Ecuador	387
Denmark	374
United Arab Emirates	368
Ireland	362
Myanmar	355
Vietnam	351
Oman	342
New Zealand	325
Thailand	286
Hungary	206
Nigeria	162
Jordan	150
Sri Lanka	146
Kuwait	144
Egypt	135
Brazil	134
Bangladesh	133
Greece	129
Argentina	125
Mexico	123
East Timor	119
Armenia	115
Lebanon	110
Cape Verde	109
Colombia	106
Suriname	106
Qatar	102
Others	1,617

Laws

The Philippine Immigration Act prescribes fourteen different visas grouped into two broad categories:

Section 9 visas (non-immigrant visas), for temporary visits such as those for tourism, business, transit, study or employment
Section 13 visas (immigrant visas), for foreign nationals who wish to become permanent residents in the Philippines

Some visas have been introduced by subsequent legislation or proclamation of the President which are not classified by the Philippine Immigration Act as either being a Section 9 or Section 13 visa. These visas are called special visas and are issued to groups such as retirees, investors and entrepreneurs.

The Bureau of Immigration was given the sole authority to enforce and administer immigration and foreign nationals registration laws including the admission, registration, exclusion and deportation and repatriation of foreign nationals. It also supervises the immigration from the Philippines of foreign nationals.

Commonwealth Act No. 473, the Revised Naturalization Law, approved June 17, 1939, provided that persons having certain specified qualifications may become a citizen of the Philippines by naturalization.

List of immigrants by country of origin 

The following groups are relatively recent immigrants and expatriate groups that mostly immigrated in the modern era, specifically around the 20th century especially from post-WW2 Philippine independence to the present era. Recent modern immigrants, expatriates, foreign students, foreign citizens with work permits and resident aliens are all included. Common reasons for modern immigration into the Philippines include employment, education, tourism, marriage migration counter flow from returning overseas Filipino workers and emigrants, etc.

See also
Overseas Filipinos
Tourism in the Philippines

Sources

 
Society of the Philippines